Naomi Frederick  is an English actress and graduate of the Royal Academy of Dramatic Arts. She is notable for stage work and has also appeared on radio, appearing in 2012 adaptations of Twelfth Night and Sparkling Cyanide. Her television work includes "Eagle Day", a 2002 episode of Foyle's War. In 2015, she appeared as Juana Inés de la Cruz in the Shakespeare's Globe production of Helen Edmundson's The Heresy of Love.

Career

Film

Television

Theatre

References

External links
 

Living people
1976 births
British film actresses
English film actresses
English stage actresses
English television actresses
Alumni of RADA
21st-century English actresses